Royal Air Force Wyton or more simply RAF Wyton  is a Royal Air Force station near St Ives, Cambridgeshire, England. The airfield is decommissioned and is now home to the Joint Forces Intelligence Group.

History

Flying station

 
Wyton has been a military airfield since 1916, when it was used for training by the Royal Flying Corps and then its successor the Royal Air Force (RAF).

During the Second World War it was used primarily as a bomber base, flying Bristol Blenheim, de Havilland Mosquito and Avro Lancaster aircraft. In 1942 it became the home of the Pathfinder Force under the command of Group Captain Don Bennett.

After the war Wyton became home to the English Electric Canberras of the Strategic Reconnaissance Force. Vickers Valiants arrived for No. 543 Squadron in 1955 and a Handley Page Victor arrived for the Radar Reconnaissance Flight in 1959.

In 1974, three Nimrod R1s belonging to No. 51 Squadron arrived for use in the Elint and Sigint role, and in 1975, the T17 and T17A Canberras of No. 360 Squadron arrived: this was a joint RAF and RN Squadron specialising in Electronic countermeasures training.

In the early 1990s one of its pilots was the rugby union player, Flight Lieutenant Rory Underwood.

During a four-month period in 1989, two squadrons of U.S. Air Force Fairchild Republic A-10 Thunderbolt II jets were operated out of RAF Wyton while the runway at their base, nearby RAF Alconbury, was resurfaced.

In May 1995 both RAF Wyton and RAF Alconbury airfields were decommissioned and Wyton was formally amalgamated with RAF Brampton, and later with RAF Henlow to make all three locations a single RAF Station under a single station commander for administrative purposes. The airfield continued to host light aircraft for the Cambridge and London University Air Squadrons until they both moved to RAF Wittering in 2015.

2011–present
Following the 2010 Strategic Defence and Security Review the RAF Brampton Wyton Henlow formation was disbanded: RAF Henlow subsequently became a separate station again and RAF Brampton was demolished.

The Joint Forces Intelligence Group, a unit which is responsible for the collection of signals, geospatial, imagery and measurement and signature intelligence, moved from Feltham in Middlesex to RAF Wyton in 2013. 42 Engineer Regiment relocated from Denison Barracks in Hermitage to RAF Wyton to co-locate with the Joint Forces Intelligence Group in July 2014 and No. 1 Intelligence Surveillance Reconnaissance Squadron moved from RAF Marham to Wyton in April 2017.

Former units

The following squadrons were posted to Wyton between 1916 and 1935:
 No. 46 Squadron RFC between 1916 and 1916.
 No. 65 Squadron RFC between 1916 and 1917.
 No. 83 Squadron RFC between 1917 and 1917.
 No. 96 Squadron RAF between 1918 and 1918.
 No. 104 Squadron RFC between 1917 and 1917.
 No. 117 Squadron RAF between 1918 and 1919.
 No. 119 Squadron RAF between 1918 and 1918.
 No. 120 Squadron RAF between 1918 and 1918.
 No. 130 Squadron RAF between 1918 and 1918.
 No. 156 Squadron RAF between 1918 and 1918.
 No. 211 Squadron RAF between 1919 and 1919.

The following squadrons were posted to Wyton between 1935 and 1939:
 No. 44 Squadron between 1937 and 1937.
 No. 114 Squadron between 1936 and 1939.
 No. 139 Squadron between 1936 and 1939.

The following squadrons were posted to Wyton between 1939 and 1945:
 No. 15 Squadron between 1939 and 1940.
 No. 15 Squadron for a second time between 1940 and 1942.
 No. 40 Squadron between 1939 and 1941.
 No. 57 Squadron between 1940 and 1940.
 No. 57 Squadron for a second time between 1940 and 1940.
 No. 83 Squadron for a second time between 1942 and 1944.
 No. 105 Squadron between 1942 and 1945
 No. 109 Squadron between 1942 and 1942.
 No. 109 Squadron for a second time between 1942 and 1943.
 No. 128 Squadron between 1944 and 1945.
 No. 139 Squadron for a second time between 1943 and 1944.
 No. 156 Squadron for a second time between 1945 and 1945.
 No. 163 Squadron between 1945 and 1945.

The following squadrons were posted to Wyton between 1946 and 2011:
 No. 13 Squadron between 1978 and 1982.
 No. 15 Squadron for a third time between 1946 and 1950.
 No. 25 Squadron between 1983 and 1989.
 No. 26 Squadron between 1969 and 1976.
 No. 39 Squadron between 1970 and 1982.
 No. 44 Squadron for a second time between 1946 and 1951.
 No. 51 Squadron between 1963 and 1995.
 No. 58 Squadron between 1953 and 1970.
 No. 82 Squadron between 1953 and 1956.
No. 85 Squadron between 1989 and 1991
 No. 90 Squadron between 1946 and 1950.
 No. 100 Squadron between 1956 and 1956.
 No. 100 Squadron for a second time between 1982 and 19??.
 No. 138 Squadron between 1946 and 1950.
 No. 207 Squadron between 1969 and 1984.
 No. 360 Squadron between 1975 and 19??.
 No. 540 Squadron between 1953 and 1956.
 No. 542 Squadron between 1954 and 1955.
 No. 542 Squadron for a second time between 1955 and 1955.
 No. 543 Squadron between 1955 and 1974.

Other units moved (now disbanded)

The following other units were posted to Wyton at some point:

 No. 1 Photographic Reconnaissance Unit RAF
 No. 2 Group Communications Flight RAF
 No. 4 Blind Approach Training Flight RAF
 No. 7 Group Communications Flight RAF
 8th Aero Squadron
 No. 8 Group Communications Flight RAF
 No. 8 (Pathfinder Force) Group RAF
 No. 13 Aircraft Modification Unit RAF
 No. 70 (Bomber) Wing RAF
 No. 231 Operational Conversion Unit RAF
 No. 1323 (Canberra) Flight RAF
 No. 1409 (Meteorological) Flight RAF
 No. 1499 (Bombing) Gunnery Flight RAF
 No. 1504 (Beam Approach Training) Flight RAF
 No. 1655 Mosquito Training Unit RAF
 No. 2730 Squadron RAF Regiment
 No. 2763 Squadron RAF Regiment
 No. 2781 Squadron RAF Regiment
 No. 2844 Squadron RAF Regiment
 Canberra Air Race Flight RAF (1953)
 Canberra Standardisation and Training Flight RAF
 Electronic Warfare Detachment RAF
 Electronic Warfare Division RAF
 Electronic Warfare Engineering and Training Unit RAF (-1976) became Electronic Warfare and Avionics Unit RAF (1976-1993)
 Electronic Warfare Operational Support Establishment RAF (1983-1995) becoming part of Air Warfare Centre 1993
 Equipment Support (Air) Group RAF
 Ground Controlled Approach Operators School RAF
 Logistics Command RAF
 Radar Reconnaissance Flight RAF

Currently operational units moved

On 25 March 2013 it was decided to relocate the following flying units from Wyton due to the high maintenance costs of the airfield.

57(R) Squadron relocated to RAF Cranwell in Summer 2013.
Cambridge University Air Squadron relocated to RAF Wittering in mid-2014.
University of London Air Squadron relocated to RAF Wittering in mid-2014.
5 Air Experience Flight also relocated to RAF Wittering in mid-2014.

Based units
Notable units based at RAF Wyton.

Strategic Command 
Defence Intelligence
 Joint Forces Intelligence Group (JFIG)
 Defence Intelligence Fusion Centre (DIFC)
Defence Digital
 Defence Assurance and Information Security

Royal Air Force 
No. 1 Group (Air Combat) RAF
 No. 1 Intelligence Surveillance Reconnaissance Wing
 No. 1 Intelligence Surveillance Reconnaissance Squadron
 RAF Wyton Area Voluntary Band
No. 22 Group (Training) RAF
Headquarters, Central & Eastern Region, Air Training Corps
Headquarters, Bedfordshire and Cambridgshire Wing, Air Training Corps
No. 2331 (St Ives) Squadron (Air Training Corps)

British Army 
Royal Engineers
 42 Engineer Regiment (Geographic)
 13 Geographic Squadron
 14 Geographic Squadron
 16 Geographic Support Squadron
 135 Geographic Squadron

Ministry of Defence 
 Defence Infrastructure Organisation 
 Defence Intelligence Estates Rationalisation Team (PRIDE)
 Ministry of Defence Police

United States Department of Defense 
 Defense Contract Management Agency – United Kingdom

See also

 List of Royal Air Force stations
RAF Wyton Area Voluntary Band

References

Citations

Bibliography
 

 RAF Annual Review 2012

External links

 Official site
 RAF Wyton Area Voluntary Band

Royal Air Force stations in Huntingdonshire
Royal Air Force stations in Cambridgeshire
Royal Flying Corps airfields
Royal Air Force stations of World War II in the United Kingdom
Airports established in 1916
1916 establishments in England